Lantau South Country Park is one of two rural country parks on Lantau Island, Hong Kong, the other one being Lantau North Country Park and its extension.

Lantau South Country Park is located on the south side of the island. It was designated on 20 April 1978. At , it is the largest country park in Hong Kong.

Sites
Lantau Peak
Sunset Peak
Yi Tung Shan
Fan Lau
Shek Pik Reservoir
Chi Ma Wan Peninsula

External links

Lantau South Country Park

Country parks and special areas of Hong Kong
Lantau Island
1978 establishments in Hong Kong